Say Less is the debut studio album by Canadian recording artist Roy Woods. The album was released on December 1, 2017, by OVO Sound, Warner Records and Unlock The Underground. It features guest appearances from OVO labelmates PartyNextDoor and Dvsn, alongside 24hrs and PnB Rock. It is preceded by one single; "What Are You On?".

Background
On March 9, 2017, the album's title was announced by Roy Woods via Twitter. The tracklist, release date and pre-order for the album was revealed on November 17, 2017.

Singles
The first promotional single, "Say Less" was released on the November 17, 2017, same date of the album's tracklist and release date reveal. The second promotional single, "Balance" featuring Dvsn and PnB Rock was released on November 23, 2017.

The lead single, "What Are You On?" was released on July 21, 2017.

Promotion

Tour

On January 30, 2018, Roy Woods announced an official headlining concert tour to further promote the album titled Say Less Tour. The tour began on March 17, 2018, in Orlando, at Backbooth.

Track listing
Credits adapted from the album's liner notes and BMI.

Notes
 "Balance" features additional vocals by Jessie Ware and Daniel Dove

Personnel
All programming and instrumentation is credited to the producers of each track, including where noted.

Musicians
 Sunny Khokhar – all instruments, programming 
 Steven Resendes – all instruments, programming 

Technical
 Sunny Diamonds – recording , mixing 
 Pro Logic – recording 
 FKi 1st – recording 
 Noel "Gadget" Campbell – mixing 
 Noah "40" Shebib – mixing assistance 
 Greg Moffett – mixing assistance 
 Harley Arsenault – mixing assistance 
 Greg Morrison – mixing assistance 
 Chris Athens – mastering 
 David "DC" Castro – mastering  assistance 

Additional personnel
 UTU Management – creative direction
 Mudasser Ali – creative direction
 Diana Spencer – art direction

Charts

References

2017 debut albums
Roy Woods albums
OVO Sound albums
Warner Records albums
Albums produced by Nineteen85
Albums produced by Murda Beatz